Hadar Hatorah (full name: Yeshiva Kol Yaakov Yehuda Hadar Hatorah Rabbinical Seminary) is a Chabad men's yeshiva in Brooklyn, New York.  It is the world's first yeshiva for baalei teshuva.

History
The yeshiva, located at 824 Eastern Parkway, Brooklyn, New York 11213, was founded in 1962 by Rabbi Yisroel Jacobson, a Chabad activist, to accommodate baalei teshuva interested in full-time study in a traditional yeshiva environment.  It has been located in the Chabad-Lubavitch Hasidic community in the multi-ethnic neighborhood of Crown Heights in Brooklyn, New York since inception. The yeshiva was first located within the Chabad world headquarters building at 770 Eastern Parkway before moving to its present location at 824 Eastern Parkway following growing enrolment.

The yeshiva is a branch of the National Committee for the Furtherance of Jewish Education (NCFJE). Rabbi Jacob J. Hecht, executive vice president and national director of the NCFJE, played a pivotal role in the yeshiva's development and was its dean. After his death the yeshiva was renamed as Yeshivas Kol Yaakov Yehudah - Hadar Hatorah Rabbinical Seminary in recognition of his efforts. 

The yeshiva curriculum includes Torah study, prayer, Jewish law, Hasidic teachings and Jewish values.  Some of the courses are academically recognized and can be transferred to colleges for credits. 

The school accommodates students of all backgrounds, and with affiliation to all Jewish movements.

Faculty
Rosh Yeshiva: Rabbi Yaakov Goldberg.
Mashpia: Rabbi Yosef Boruch Wircberg.
Mashgiach: Rabbi Yankl Osdoba.

Notable alumni
Rabbi Yishaya Rose 
Abe Saks 
Matisyahu
 Rabbi Leible Morrison

References
Notes

External links
Hadar Hatorah Yeshiva website
Published Reunion Journals by the Yeshiva 
Beginning history of Hadar Hatorah
Online audio library of classes given at Hadar Hatorah

Baalei teshuva institutions
Chabad outreach
Chabad schools
Educational institutions established in 1962
1962 establishments in New York City
Orthodox yeshivas in Brooklyn
Chabad yeshivas